Keno is a male Germanic given name, specifically of Frisian origin. The name derives from the Old Germanic name Kuonrat, from conja meaning "bold" and rad "counsel". It is a diminutive of Konrad.

People

Given name 
Keno Davis, Central Michigan University head basketball coach
Keno Hills, an American football tailback
Don Rosa (Keno Don H. Rosa, known simply as Don Rosa), an American comic book writer and illustrator known for his stories about Scrooge McDuck, Donald Duck and other Disney characters

Surname 
Leigh and Leslie Keno, American antiques experts

Nickname 
Keno (singer), Filipino singer
Keno (footballer), Brazilian footballer

References

Frisian masculine given names
Germanic masculine given names